Jandakot Airport  is a general aviation (GA) airport located in Jandakot, Western Australia, about  south-southwest of the "general aviation area of the Airport West precinct" at Perth Airport. Jandakot airport opened in 1963. From 1 July 1998, Jandakot Airport Holdings purchased a 50-year lease with a 49-year option to operate and maintain the airport including its conservation areas.

Originally built on unproductive farm lands, it is now among residential suburbs in the south of the Perth metropolitan area, within the City of Cockburn, and just south of Leeming and west of Canning Vale.

Jandakot Airport is "the busiest general aviation airport in Australia in terms of aircraft movements". The airport recorded 208,778 aircraft movements in the fiscal year ending 30 June 2018, also making it the sixth-busiest civilian airport in Australia in that period as measured by aircraft movements. The airport reported 275,506 aircraft movements in the fiscal year 2011, making it the busiest civilian airport in Australia in terms of aircraft movements in that financial year. Jandakot Airport has a theoretical operating capacity of 526,000 aircraft movements per annum, which could be reached "within the 20-year planning horizon of" the 2014 Jandakot Airport Master Plan.

Tenants 

The airport provides a base for essential service organisations such as the Royal Flying Doctor Service (RFDS), Department of Environment and Conservation Forest and Bushfire Patrol, Fire and Emergency Services Authority of Western Australia (FESA) (now known as DFES) emergency helicopter and the WA Police Air Support. Jandakot is also an important training base for international and domestic airline pilots, with Singapore Airlines operating its own pilot training establishment (Singapore Flying College); China Southern Airlines also has a flying college at the airport, as well as Advanced Cockpit Flight Training.

Over 65 businesses employing 900 people operate at what is Australia's largest GA airport. In addition to ten flying schools for both fixed wing and rotary operations, three flying clubs, large maintenance, avionics, spares, instruments, electrical, aircraft sales, banner towing, aerial survey and photographic businesses are present. These include Airflite, a large defence contractor and Fugro the world's largest aerial geophysical survey company. There are also a number of charter operators such as Penjet Aviation, Corsaire, Casair, Goldfields Air Services, Brooks Airways which provide flights for the fly-in fly-out staff of remote mining companies.

On the main road opposite the tower there is a memorial to Robin Miller, the "Sugarbird Lady", who as a nurse and later RFDS pilot brought vaccinations to remote Western Australian communities.

Natural environment 

Within the airport boundaries, 290 native flora species have been identified including the endangered Grand Spider Orchid (caladenia hueglii). Over 100 fauna species have also been identified. The Southern Brown Bandicoot and kangaroos can be seen feeding on the maintained areas of grassland around sunset most nights. Two sites of Aboriginal heritage land have been identified with the airport; both of these are included in the conservation reserve. These sites contain scattered small artifacts.

Relocation plans 
On 15 June 2006, Jandakot Airport Holdings, after being bought out by property developer Ascot Capital Limited, announced a proposal to relocate the airport's operations to the southern outskirts of Perth, possibly to a site in the Shire of Murray near the city of Mandurah. The proposal's success depends on the successful negotiation of a land swap arrangement with State and Commonwealth governments. The Jandakot Airport Chamber of Commerce and many users of Jandakot Airport were opposed to the relocation, as were the residents of the proposed site but not the residents at its current site.

Mark Vaile, the former Federal Minister for Transport, in December 2006 formally advised the leaseholders of Jandakot Airport that the Federal Government had effectively stopped any plans for the relocation of the airport for the foreseeable future. Under the provisions of the Airports Act 1996 and the lease granted to Jandakot Airport Holdings, the leaseholders are to give priority to running the airport as an airport.

Jandakot City 
In 2006, Ascot Capital Limited announced plans to develop  of land around the airport, approved for non-aviation related development by the federal government. Harvey Norman confirmed that they will take up , including  of floorspace, in the first stage of Jandakot City.

Flight-specific information 

This airport has three runways: 
 06L/24R, 
 06R/24L, 
 12/30, 
 Latitude: 32°05'51"S (−32.096667)
 Longitude: 115°52'52"E (115.881667)
 Elevation: 
 Time Zone: UTC+8

Frequencies in use:
 Tower 1/CTAF(R): 118.1 (runway 12/30 and 06L/24R all departures except Armadale)
 Tower 2: 119.4 (runway 06R/24L departures to Armadale and circuits)
 Ground: 124.3
 ATIS: 128.65, 281
 PAL: 123.9
 NDB: 281
 RAS: 132.95
 Fuel: 129.9 (Air BP), 121.8 (Viva Energy)

See also
 Aviation transport in Australia
 List of airports in Western Australia
 List of busiest airports by aircraft movements
 Perth Airport

Notes

References

External links

 Jandakot Airport official website
 Jandakot Tower (Airservices Australia)
 Airservices Aerodromes & Procedure Charts

Transport in Perth, Western Australia
Airports in Western Australia
Buildings and structures in Perth, Western Australia
Airports established in 1963
1963 establishments in Australia